Illinois Central No. 790 is a preserved steam locomotive, the only Illinois Central Railroad 2-8-0 Consolidation type of its class to survive into the diesel age of train transportation.  It is part of the Steamtown National Historic Site collection in Scranton, Pennsylvania.

History
This locomotive was built in 1903 by American Locomotive Company as a 2-8-0 Consolidation type.  It was originally owned by Chicago Union Transfer Railway and numbered 100. It (and sisters 101–103) were sold to Illinois Central Railroad Company in 1904 and renumbered 641–644. The railroad, which dated back to 1851, operated 4,265 miles of track between Chicago, Illinois and New Orleans, Louisiana.  This locomotive pulled heavy freight in Tennessee and "must have seen hard service, for reportedly the Illinois Central rebuilt it in 1918, modernizing it with a superheater, and possibly replacing the boiler and firebox".

In January 1943 the four locomotives were renumbered 790–793 and remained in service until it was replaced by diesel-electric locomotives and put into storage. Two locomotives, 791 and 793, were scrapped in 1955, and 792 suffered a similar fate in August 1957. "The railroad nevertheless had to fire No. 790 up in the spring to assist Illinois Central trains through track inundated by floodwaters near Cedar Rapids, because diesel-electric locomotives, with their electric motors mounted on the axles within the frames of the trucks (called bogies outside of the United States), shorted out in any water, whereas even the bottom of the firebox in a steam locomotive was much higher above the rail, hence above flood waters."  It was sold to Louis S. Keller of Cedar Rapids, Iowa, in 1959 who had hoped to use it for excursions. It was used for "flood duty" in April 1965 at the Clinton Corn Processing Company "where it plowed through overflow from the Mississippi River."  Later that year it was sold to David de Camp who planned to use it in the area of Lake Placid, New York, but these plans were not met. It became part of the Steamtown, U.S.A. collection in Bellows Falls, Vermont when it was sold to F. Nelson Blount in January 1966.

The only surviving locomotive of the Chicago Union Transfer Railway, No. 790 is the only Illinois Central 2-8-0 Consolidation type of its class to survive. "About 146 standard gauge 2-8-0s survive in the United States, including Illinois Central No. 790".  After the nationalization of Steamtown, the Steamtown National Historic Site retained this locomotive on the suggestion of the Steamtown Special History Study.

References

2-8-0 locomotives
0790
ALCO locomotives
Individual locomotives of the United States
Standard gauge locomotives of the United States
Railway locomotives introduced in 1903
Preserved steam locomotives of Pennsylvania